Bruno Musarò (born 27 June 1948)  is an Italian prelate of the Catholic Church who works in the diplomatic service of the Holy See. He has been the Apostolic Nuncio to Costa Rica since 2019.

Biography
Born in Andrano on 27 June 1948, Bruno Nusarò was ordained a priest on 19 September 1971. He entered the diplomatic service of the Holy See in 1977 and served in Korea, Italy, the Republic of Central Africa, Panama, Bangladesh, and Spain.

On 3 December 1994, Pope John Paul II named him apostolic nuncio to Panama and Titular Archbishop of Abari.   He received his episcopal consecration on 6 January 1995. On 25 September 1999 John Paul appointed him Apostolic Nuncio to Madagascar, Seychelles and Mauritius and Apostolic Delegate to Comoros and Réunion. On 10 February 2004 he was appointed the Nuncio to Guatemala On 5 January 2009, Pope Benedict XVI named him the Apostolic Nuncio to Peru, and on 6 August 2011 the Apostolic Nuncio to Cuba.

In September 2014, Musaro spoke openly about Cuba’s "extreme poverty and human and civil degradation". Musaro made his remarks while on vacation in Italy. The Cuban people are "victims of a socialist dictatorship that has kept them subjugated for the past 56 years," Musaro said. "I’m thankful to the pope for inviting me to this island, and I hope to leave once that the socialist regime has disappeared indefinitely.... Only liberty can bring hope to the Cuban people."

On 2 February 2015, he was appointed Apostolic Nuncio to Egypt and delegate to the Arab League.

Pope Francis named him Apostolic Nuncio to Costa Rica on 29 August 2019.

See also
 List of heads of the diplomatic missions of the Holy See

References

External links
Catholic Hierarchy: Archbishop Bruno Musarò 

1948 births
Living people
People from the Province of Lecce
20th-century Italian Roman Catholic titular archbishops
Apostolic Nuncios to Peru
Apostolic Nuncios to Cuba
Apostolic Nuncios to Guatemala
Apostolic Nuncios to Madagascar
Apostolic Nuncios to Panama
Apostolic Nuncios to Seychelles
Apostolic Nuncios to Mauritius
Apostolic Nuncios to Egypt
Apostolic Nuncios to the Arab League
Apostolic Nuncios to the Comoros
Apostolic Nuncios to Costa Rica
Pontifical Ecclesiastical Academy alumni
21st-century Italian Roman Catholic titular archbishops